Francesco Pannocchieschi d'Elci (1625 or 1626, Florence - 20 June 1702) was an Italian Roman Catholic priest and archbishop.

Life
He came from a noble Sienese family of the Pannocchieschi d'Elci, who held the status of counts. He was the son of count Ranieri and a noblewoman from the Altoviti family. One of Ranieri's brothers was cardinal Scipione Pannocchieschi, whom Francesco accompanied during Scipione's Pontifical Legature to the Republic of Venice (1647-1652). Scipione's Relazione sulle cose della repubblica offers a glimpse of life in Venice at that time. Francesco also assisted Scipione to the court of Ferdinand III, Holy Roman Emperor in Germany (1653-1654).

This acted as an introduction to the church's life in Rome - Francesco became secret chamberlin or 'cubicularius' to the pope and canon of St Peter's Basilica. He succeeded his uncle as archbishop of Pisa in 1663 and made a solemn entrance into Pisa on 23 December 1663. He remained in Pisa for almost forty years, finally dying there on 20 June 1702.

Episcopal succession
While bishop, he was the principal co-consecrator of:

References

External links and additional sources
 (for Chronology of Bishops) 
 (for Chronology of Bishops) 

Roman Catholic archbishops of Pisa
1625 births
1626 births
1702 deaths
Francesco